The Sendai 89ers (仙台89ERS) are a Japanese professional basketball team that compete in the first division of the B.League.  They are based in Sendai, Miyagi Prefecture. The team name is based on the city's founding year, 1889.

Current roster

Coaches
Honoo Hamaguchi (2005–11)
Bob Pierce (2011–13)
Takeo Mabashi
Shuto Kawachi
Toshihiro Goto
Daisuke Takaoka
Dai Oketani
Hiroki Fujita

Notable players

Attendance

Average regular season home game attendance

Total attendance at regular season games

Arenas
Xebio Arena Sendai
Kamei Arena Sendai
Minamisanriku Town General Gymnasium

Practice facilities

Haleo Dome - Homepage
Meisen Basketball Laboratory

Academy Director
Makoto Kato (fr)

References

External links
Team website 

 
Basketball teams in Japan
Basketball teams established in 2005
Sports teams in Sendai
2005 establishments in Japan